Model dwellings were buildings or estates constructed, mostly during the Victorian era, along philanthropic lines to provide decent living accommodation for the working class. They were typically erected by private model dwellings companies and usually with the aim of making a return on investment hence the description of the movement as "five per cent philanthropy." As such they were forerunners of modern-day municipal housing.

This is a list of still-standing model dwellings, organised by builder. Most of these companies are now defunct; a few, such as the Peabody Trust are still operating and building new accommodation, and others have been subsumed by larger firms. This list covers urban development on the principal of "five per cent philanthropy"; for communities built to house workers for a particular trade or employer, see model village or company town.

Artizans, Labourers & General Dwellings Company

The Artizans' Company (ALGDC) was established in 1867 by William Austin, becoming one of the largest of the model dwellings companies in the late Victorian era. It was best known for its large, low-rise, suburban estates in London. It was later subsumed into Sun Life Financial.

Chester Cottage Improvement Company

The Chester Cottage Improvement Company was founded in 1892, and was a particular concern of the Duke of Westminster.

East End Dwellings Company

The EEDC was founded by Samuel Barnett and others in 1882 in order to provide particularly for the area that is now the London Borough of Tower Hamlets.

Edinburgh Co-Operative Building Company

The Edinburgh Co-Operative Building Company (ECBC) was founded by a group of stonemasons in Edinburgh in 1861. By 1872 they had built nearly 1,000 houses in six parts of Edinburgh and Leith, commonly known as colony houses.

Four Per Cent Industrial Dwellings Company

Improved Industrial Dwellings Company

The Improved Industrial Dwellings Company (IIDC) was founded by the stationer (and later Lord Mayor) Sir Sydney Waterlow in 1863.

Metropolitan Association for Improving the Dwellings of the Industrious Classes

The MAIDIC was the first company to be formed for the specific purpose of providing model homes, in 1844. It built mainly within London.

Newcastle upon Tyne Improved Industrial Dwellings Company

The Newcastle upon Tyne Improved Industrial Dwellings Company (NUTIIDC) was founded by James Hall in 1859.

Peabody Trust

The Peabody Trust was set up following a huge gift for the poor of London from the banker George Peabody in 1862. It became one of the largest providers of model housing for the working classes.

Pilrig Model Dwellings Company

This company was founded in Edinburgh in 1849 and built the earliest model dwellings (see colony houses) in Edinburgh. The work of the PMDC was an inspiration on Henry Roberts, who went on to become one of the most prolific architects of model housing.

Society for Improving the Condition of the Labouring Classes

The SICLC was one of the earliest model dwellings companies. It grew out of the Labourer's Friend Society into a housing provider in 1844 and built a number of properties in London, most of which no longer exist.

Others
A number of other schemes were built by private individuals or other concerns.

See also
Company town
Model villages
Model Dwellings Companies
Prince Albert's Model Cottage

References

Housing in London

Company housing